Diary of a Maniac is a 1993 Italian drama film directed by Marco Ferreri. It was entered into the 43rd Berlin International Film Festival.

Cast
 Jerry Calà as Benito Balducci
 Sabrina Ferilli as Luigia
 Valentino Macchi as Chiominto
 Laetitia Laneri as Marisa
 Massimo Bucchi as Don Giuseppe
 Anna Duska Bisconti
 Luciana De Falco
 Cinzia Monreale
 Doriana Bianchi
 Maria Rosa Moratti

See also     
 List of Italian films of 1993

References

External links

1993 films
1993 drama films
Italian drama films
1990s Italian-language films
Films directed by Marco Ferreri
1990s Italian films